The 26th Trampoline World Championships were held at the Petersburg Sports and Concert Complex in Saint Petersburg, Russia from 11  to 14 November 2009.

Programme

11.11.2009 	Wednesday
 11:20 - 14:40 Individual TRA Qualifications for Groups 1-4
 15:35 - 18:05 Individual TRA Qualifications for Groups 5-7

12.11.2009 	Thursday
 11:00 - 13:00 TUM Women and DMT Men Qualifications
 14:10 - 16:10 TUM Men and DMT Women Qualifications
 19:00  	TRA Women Team Final
 19:46 	TRA Men Team Final

13.11.2009  	Friday
 11:00 - 11:30 TRA Synchro Women and Men Qualifications
 18:00 	DMT Women Team Final
 18:27  	TUM Women Team Final
 18:54 	DMT Men Team Final
 19:55 	TRA Synchro Women Final
 20:17 	TUM Men Team Final
 20:44 	Individual TRA Men Final

14.11.2009  	Saturday
 14:00  	DMT Men Final
 14:29  	TUM Men Final
 14:57  	DMT Women Final 
 16:00 	TRA Synchro Men Final
 16:22 	TUM Women Final
 16:50 	Individual TRA Women Final

Medal winners

Results

Men

Individual

Synchro

Double Mini

Tumbling

Trampoline Team

Double Mini Team

Tumbling Team

Women

Individual

Synchro

Double Mini

Tumbling

Trampoline Team

Double Mini Team

Tumbling Team

Medal table

External links
 Official results

Trampoline World Championships
Trampoline World Championships
Trampoline World Championships
Trampoline World Championships
Sports competitions in Saint Petersburg
Trampoline Gymnastics World Championships